Alexandra Corinne Pelosi (born October 5, 1970) is an American journalist, documentary filmmaker, and writer. She is a daughter of Nancy Pelosi, the former Speaker of the United States House of Representatives, and Paul Pelosi.

Early life and education 
Pelosi was born and raised in San Francisco, California. The youngest of five children, she earned a B.A. from Loyola Marymount University. In 1993, she received a master's degree from the USC Annenberg School for Communication and Journalism.

Career
While a student at Loyola Marymount, Pelosi interned at SST Records.

Network news
Before making documentaries, Pelosi spent a decade as a field producer at NBC News. In 2000, while working as a producer for NBC covering George W. Bush's presidential campaign, she brought along a handheld camcorder documenting 18 months of her experience on the campaign trail; the footage was used to create Journeys with George, a documentary that earned her six Emmy nominations.

Documentaries
In 2001, Sheila Nevins convinced Pelosi to leave network news to work exclusively for HBO. By 2017, Pelosi had filmed, produced and directed 14 documentary films, of which 13 were collaborations with Sheila Nevins. 

During the 2004 Democratic primaries, Pelosi returned to the campaign trail, this time following the Democratic candidates. Her HBO documentary, Diary of a Political Tourist, was accompanied by her first book Sneaking into the Flying Circus: How the Media Turn Our Presidential Campaigns into Freak Shows, about the process of selecting candidates for President of the United States. She stated that her conversations with Candy Crowley of CNN, Howard Dean, and Wesley Clark inspired her to write a book.

Pelosi's documentary Friends of God: A Road Trip with Alexandra Pelosi, focusing on evangelical Christians in America, aired on HBO in 2007. Pelosi interviewed former pastor Ted Haggard for the documentary. She followed this with The Trials of Ted Haggard, chronicling Haggard's exile from New Life Church after his sex and drug scandal. Alessandra Stanley, reviewing the documentary for The New York Times, called the film "strangely intriguing". Los Angeles Times critic Mary McNamara favorably reviewed the documentary, writing that "this heartbreaking little film that may wind up being the most powerful indictment of homophobia since Brokeback Mountain."  

Pelosi went back on the campaign trail in 2008 to document the birth of the Tea Party movement at Republican campaign events for her film Right America: Feeling Wronged - Some Voices from the Campaign Trail, which premiered on HBO on President's Day 2009. 

In 2010, Pelosi turned away from political documentaries to make a 2010 HBO film, Homeless: The Motel Kids of Orange County, follows the children of the working poor in Orange County, California. The New York Times praised the film for "advancing a theme of the failed American dream."

Pelosi was at the 2013 Sundance Film Festival with her film Fall to Grace, about disgraced former New Jersey governor Jim McGreevey. 

In 2015, Pelosi returned to San Francisco to make a film about the tech boom's impact on the city. The film, San Francisco 2.0 was described by Recode, as "a clear-eyed, sober recap of what's been going on...Pelosi's tale is also deeply personal; she grew up in San Francisco, but she has lived in New York for a long time. A key theme of the documentary is that the San Francisco to which she's returning is very different from the one she left." Variety called San Francisco 2.0 "one of her finest." The film was nominated for an Emmy for best business reporting.

In 2016, Pelosi made Meet the Donors: Does Money Talk? about money's influence in politics. In a profile in Vogue, Pelosi calls her film a "light romp into the road map of the people and places that are funding our elections." The film drops in on a handful of folks who rank on the OpenSecrets.org list of top donors. Uproxx described it as watching "Pelosi meet with an assortment of billionaire donors, asking them why they give millions to candidates, how this funding affects campaigns, and all the access these hefty donations can get you." On the press tour for the film, Pelosi talked about everything she has learned in her lifetime on the political fundraising circuit.

Pelosi's documentary The Words That Built America aired on HBO on July 4, 2017. The Independence Day special, narrated by historian David McCullough, including a reading of the U.S. Constitution read by all six living presidents, vice presidents, 50 US senators of both parties, Supreme Court justices, and others. It includes a reading of the Declaration of Independence read by The Rock, Meryl Streep, Robert De Niro, Robert Redford, Sean Hannity, Kid Rock, and other celebrities, as well as Pelosi's interviews with various figures at the National Republican Senatorial Committee in Washington. It closes with middle-school children from the United Nations International School reading the Bill of Rights and summaries of the other amendments.

Outside the Bubble: A Roadtrip with Alexandra Pelosi aired on HBO in October 2018. Reviewing the documentary for The New York Times, critic Shawn McCreesh wrote, "Though she is Democratic royalty, Ms. Pelosi has spent much of her career dissecting, with compassion, the psyche of the political right in America."

In January 2019, Pelosi debuted Goodbye Congress on HBO's Vice News Tonight, a film that features exit interviews with 14 retiring members of Congress, including Speaker Paul Ryan and 7 other Republicans who explain how Washington works.

In October 2020, Pelosi released American Selfie: One Nation Shoots Itself on Showtime.

After Nancy Pelosi stepped down from the Democratic leadership, HBO released Pelosi in the House which included decades of behind the scenes footage of Nancy Pelosi in the US Capitol. The SF Chronicle called the film “essential viewing.”

January 6 attack footage
On October 13, 2022, footage taken by Alexandra Pelosi was included within the Public hearings of the United States House Select Committee on the January 6 Attack. During the January 6 United States Capitol attack, the senior Congressional leadership was evacuated from the Capitol building to Fort McNair, about two miles away. Democratic leaders evacuated included House Speaker Nancy Pelosi and her senior associates Steny Hoyer and James Clyburn. Incoming Senate Majority Leader Chuck Schumer was also evacuated. Senior Senate Republicans evacuated to Fort McNair included outgoing Senate Majority Leader Mitch McConnell and Senators Chuck Grassley and John Thune. House Republican leaders evacuated to Fort McNair included House Minority Leader Kevin McCarthy  and Steve Scalise. Videos recorded by Alexandra Pelosi during those hours showed desperate phone calls imploring government officials to come to the defense of members of Congress, and were released by the committee in October 2022.

Personal life
On June 18, 2005, in Greenwich Village, she married Dutch journalist and lawyer Michiel Vos.

In 2006, Pelosi gave birth to their first child, a boy named Paul, named after Pelosi's father Paul Pelosi. Pelosi had a second son in 2007, named Thomas, after his great grandfather Thomas D'Alesandro Jr.

Nancy Pelosi's children and grandchildren sometimes appear with her at public events. In a joint interview on CNN, Paul Ryan and Nancy Pelosi noted that Ryan has a friendship with Pelosi's grandchildren.

Filmography
 2002: Journeys with George
 2004: Diary of a Political Tourist
 2007: Friends of God: A Road Trip with Alexandra Pelosi
 2009: The Trials of Ted Haggard
 2009: Right America: Feeling Wronged – Some Voices from the Campaign Trail
 2010: Homeless: The Motel Kids of Orange County
 2011: Citizen USA: A 50 State Road Trip
 2013: Fall to Grace
 2015: San Francisco 2.0
 2016: Meet the Donors: Does Money Talk?
 2017: The Words That Built America
 2018: Outside the Bubble: A Roadtrip with Alexandra Pelosi
 2019: Goodbye Congress
 2020: American Selfie: One Nation Shoots Itself
 2022: Pelosi in the House

References

External links

 Official website
 Official website (archived)

 Alexandra Pelosi: Media Star and Media Critic in Recount
 The Sex Lives of Evangelicals
 Alexandra Pelosi Charlie Rose, Oct 31. 2002

1970 births
Living people
American documentary filmmakers
American film producers
American people of Italian descent
American political writers
American television directors
American women journalists
American women writers
California Democrats
Film directors from New York City
Film directors from San Francisco
Loyola Marymount University alumni
New York (state) Democrats
Pelosi family
People from Greenwich Village
USC Annenberg School for Communication and Journalism alumni
American women documentary filmmakers
American women television directors
Writers from San Francisco